IEEE 802.11ax, officially marketed by the Wi-Fi Alliance as  (2.4 GHz and 5 GHz) and  (6 GHz), is an IEEE standard for wireless local-area networks (WLANs) and the successor of 802.11ac. It is also known as High Efficiency , for the overall improvements to  clients in dense environments. It is designed to operate in license-exempt bands between 1 and 7.125 GHz, including the 2.4 and 5 GHz bands already in common use as well as the much wider 6 GHz band (e.g. 5.925–7.125 GHz in the US, a band 1.200 GHz wide).

The main goal of this standard is enhancing throughput-per-area in high-density scenarios, such as corporate offices, shopping malls and dense residential apartments. While the nominal data rate improvement against 802.11ac is only 37%, the overall throughput increase (over an entire network) is 300% (hence High Efficiency). This also translates to 75% lower latency.

The quadrupling of overall throughput is made possible by a higher spectral efficiency. The key feature underpinning 802.11ax is orthogonal frequency-division multiple access (OFDMA), which is equivalent to cellular technology applied into . Other improvements on spectrum utilization are better power-control methods to avoid interference with neighboring networks, higher order 1024QAM, up-link direction added with the down-link of MIMO and MU-MIMO to further increase throughput, as well as dependability improvements of power consumption and security protocols such as Target Wake Time and WPA3.

The  standard was finalised on September 1, 2020 when Draft 8 received 95% approval in the sponsor ballot and received final approval from the IEEE Standards Board on February 1, 2021.

Rate set 

Notes

OFDMA 
In 802.11ac (802.11's previous amendment), multi-user MIMO was introduced, which is a spatial multiplexing technique. MU-MIMO allows the access point to form beams towards each client, while transmitting information simultaneously. By doing so, the interference between clients is reduced, and the overall throughput is increased, since multiple clients can receive data simultaneously.

With 802.11ax, a similar multiplexing is introduced in the frequency domain: OFDMA. With OFDMA, multiple clients are assigned to different Resource Units in the available spectrum. By doing so, an 80 MHz channel can be split into multiple Resource Units, so that multiple clients receive different types of data over the same spectrum, simultaneously.

To support OFDMA, 802.11ax needs four times as many subcarriers as 802.11ac. Specifically, for 20, 40, 80, and 160 MHz channels, the 802.11ac standard has, respectively, 64, 128, 256 and 512 subcarriers while the 802.11ax standard has 256, 512, 1,024, and 2,048 subcarriers. Since the available bandwidths have not changed and the number of subcarriers increases by a factor of four, the subcarrier spacing is reduced by the same factor. This introduces OFDM symbols that are four times longer: in 802.11ac, an OFDM symbol takes 3.2 microseconds to transmit. In 802.11ax, it takes 12.8 microseconds (both without guard intervals).

Technical improvements 
The 802.11ax amendment brings several key improvements over 802.11ac. 802.11ax addresses frequency bands between 1 GHz and 6 GHz. Therefore, unlike 802.11ac, 802.11ax also operates in the unlicensed 2.4 GHz band. To meet the goal of supporting dense 802.11 deployments, the following features have been approved.

Notes

Comparison

References

External links
 Evgeny Khorov, Anton Kiryanov, Andrey Lyakhov, Giuseppe Bianchi. 'A Tutorial on IEEE 802.11ax High Efficiency WLANs', IEEE Communications Surveys & Tutorials, vol. 21, no. 1, pp. 197–216, First quarter 2019. 
 "What is Wi-Fi 6? (Wi-Fi 6 Wireless Standard Explained)"
 
 
 Shein, Esther, Deloitte: Don't rule out Wi-Fi 6 as a next-generation wireless network, TechRepublic, November 30, 2021

ax